Takht-e Ali Zali (also Romanized as Takht-e ʿAlī Zālī) is a village in Sardasht Rural District, Zeydun District, Behbahan County, Khuzestan Province, Iran. At the 2006 census, its population was 36, in 4 families.

References 

Populated places in Behbahan County